Central Island, also known as Crocodile Island, is a volcanic island located in the middle of Lake Turkana in Kenya. It is also the location of Central Island National Park, which is governed by the Kenya Wildlife Service.

It is composed of more than a dozen craters and cones, three of which are filled by small lakes. The two largest lakes partially fill craters up to a kilometre wide and about 80 m deep, the floors of which are near sea level. The highest point on the dominantly basaltic island reaches 550 m, about 190 m above the lake surface. An E-W-trending chain of small explosion craters cuts the eastern side of the 3-km-wide island. Several small islands to the SE represent partially submerged crater rims, and other cones and lava plugs lie beneath the lake surface near the island.

The youngest Central Islands tuffs and lavas may be as young as Holocene (Karson and Curtis, 1992). Fumarolic activity is concentrated along the NE-to-SE rim of the central crater, and sprays of sulfur from the fumaroles were observed by visitors in the 1930s. In 1974 intense emission of molten sulfur and steam clouds were seen from the mainland.

References

External links 
 Kenya Wildlife Service – Central Island National Park
 Cheetah Revolution Safaris - Central Island National Park

Volcanoes of Kenya
Uninhabited islands of Kenya
National parks of Kenya
World Heritage Sites in Kenya
Lake islands of Kenya
Lake Turkana